Pirjevec is a Slovene surname, found mostly in the Slovenian Littoral and among Slovenes in the Italian provinces of Trieste and Gorizia.

Notable persons with this surname include:

Avgust Pirjevec, literary historian
Dušan Pirjevec, literary historian and philosopher
Jože Pirjevec, historian
Marija Pirjevec, literary historian

References 

Slovene-language surnames